Blaník is a mountain and a protected landscape area in the Czech Republic.

Blanik or Blaník may also refer to:

LET L-13 Blaník, a sailplane produced by Let Kunovice
7498 Blaník, an asteroid
Leszek Blanik, Polish gymnast
Blanik (vault), double front vault first performed by Blanik, named after him
Blaník, the last work of Má vlast by Bedřich Smetana